Evan Worthington (born Evan White, September 18, 1995) is an American football safety for the Philadelphia Stars of the United States Football League (USFL). He played college football at Colorado.

Professional career

After going unselected in the 2019 NFL Draft, Worthington was signed as an undrafted free agent by the Baltimore Ravens. He was waived on May 6, 2019.

On February 13, 2020, Worthington signed a contract with the Calgary Stampeders of the Canadian Football League (CFL), but the season was cancelled.

In 2021, Worthington played for the Generals of The Spring League.

Worthington was signed by the Philadelphia Stars of the United States Football League (USFL) on April 1, 2022.

References

Living people
Sportspeople from Aurora, Colorado
American football safeties
Colorado Buffaloes football players
Baltimore Ravens players
Calgary Stampeders players
The Spring League players
Philadelphia Stars (2022) players
1995 births